Hendrik Menso (22 February 1791, Rhenen - 3 March 1872, Rhenen) was a Dutch politician.

1791 births
1872 deaths
Mayors in Utrecht (province)
Members of the House of Representatives (Netherlands)
People from Rhenen
Utrecht University alumni